Nenad Bjelica (born 20 August 1971) is a Croatian professional football manager and former player who was most recently in charge of Prva HNL club Osijek.

Club career 
Born in Osijek, Bjelica started playing for a local club, Metalac Olt, in the 1989–90 season. He quickly moved to NK Osijek and spent almost four seasons there, before moving abroad to Spain.

Bjelica played for Albacete Balompié for four years, during which the team reached the Copa del Rey semi-final in the 1994–95 season. In 1996 he moved to Real Betis and was in the team that was the runner-up in the 1996–97 campaign. The next season, Bjelica spent at UD Las Palmas, but returned to Real Betis a year later. Due to injuries, he played very few games in this period, and would again spend a season at Las Palmas until the end of 1999.

Bjelica then returned home to Osijek for two seasons and recovered his form, playing with the team in three stages of the UEFA Cup. He then moved to 1. FC Kaiserslautern in 2000, where he spent four seasons until semi-retiring top-tier football in 2004. During the 2004–05 season, Bjelica played for VfB Admira Wacker Mödling. After that, he played for the Austrian club FC Kärnten in the Second League before retiring on 30 June 2008.

International career 
Bjelica made his debut for Croatia in a February 2001 friendly match against Austria and earned a total of 9 caps, scoring no goals. His final international was a June 2004 European Championship match against France in Portugal. He retired from the team in that year, at the same time the manager Otto Barić was replaced.

Managerial career 

Bjelica began his coaching career on 15 September 2007 at FC Kärnten, as player-caretaker manager. On 1 July 2008, he signed a full managing contract, just a day after ending his playing career.

Bjelica was the head coach of Lustenau 07 from March to December 2009, as well as of WAC St. Andrä from May 2010 to June 2013. Bjelica moved to Austria Wien on 17 June 2013 as their new head coach, and qualified for the 2013–14 UEFA Champions League group stage, defeating the Croatian champion Dinamo Zagreb in the last round of qualification, with the club. Bjelica was sacked on 16 February 2014. As Austria Wien failed to qualify for the UEFA Europa League nonetheless at the end of the season, his contract expired.

In June 2014, he was hired by Serie B side Spezia. On 30 August 2016, he was appointed head coach at Polish side Lech Poznań. On 10 May 2018, he was released from his contract at Lech.

On 15 May 2018, Bjelica signed a two-year contract with the Croatian champion Dinamo Zagreb, being appointed as their head coach. Four days later, he celebrated winning the league title, while on 23 May he won the Croatian Cup. On 8 November, Dinamo managed to qualify for the 2018–19 UEFA Europa League knockout phase, defeating Spartak Trnava. On 18 September 2019, Bjelica led Dinamo in the club's inaugural match in the UEFA Champions League after two seasons, with a 4–0 home win against Atalanta. On 16 April 2020, following the sacking of the entire coaching staff by the club, it was announced that Dinamo terminated the contract with Bjelica.

In September 2020, after failing to win three opening games of their season, Croatian club Osijek sacked their head coach Ivica Kulešević and appointed Bjelica instead.

Personal life 
Bjelica is of paternal Serbian and maternal Croatian descent. In 1997, he married his wife Senka. The couple have two sons: Luka and Luan.

Managerial statistics

Honours

Manager

Club  
WAC St. Andrä
Austrian Second League: 2011–12

Dinamo Zagreb
Prva HNL: 2017–18, 2018–19
Croatian Cup: 2017–18
Croatian Super Cup: 2019

Individual 
Croatian Footballer of the Year: 2000
SN Sportsperson of the Year: 2019

References

External links
 
 Nenad Bjelica Interview

1971 births
Living people
Footballers from Osijek
Croatian people of Montenegrin descent
Association football midfielders
Croatian footballers
Croatia under-21 international footballers
Croatia international footballers
UEFA Euro 2004 players
NK Osijek players
Albacete Balompié players
Real Betis players
UD Las Palmas players
1. FC Kaiserslautern players
FC Admira Wacker Mödling players
FC Kärnten players
Croatian Football League players
La Liga players
Bundesliga players
Austrian Football Bundesliga players
Croatian expatriate footballers
Expatriate footballers in Spain
Croatian expatriate sportspeople in Spain
Expatriate footballers in Germany
Croatian expatriate sportspeople in Germany
Expatriate footballers in Austria
Croatian expatriate sportspeople in Austria
Croatian football managers
FC Kärnten managers
Wolfsberger AC managers
FK Austria Wien managers
Spezia Calcio managers
Lech Poznań managers
GNK Dinamo Zagreb managers
NK Osijek managers
Austrian Football Bundesliga managers
Serie B managers
Ekstraklasa managers
Croatian Football League managers
Croatian expatriate football managers
Expatriate football managers in Austria
Expatriate football managers in Italy
Croatian expatriate sportspeople in Italy
Expatriate football managers in Poland
Croatian expatriate sportspeople in Poland